The Last of the Gypsies is the eighth studio album by the Canadian rock band Trooper, released in 1989 on the band's self-owned Great Pacific Records label and distributed by Warner Music Canada. It came after a six-year recording absence and was certified Gold in Canada. The album featured the singles "Boy with a Beat", "The Best Way (to Hold a Man)" and "Thin White Line".

Track listing
(McGuire/Smith)

 3:48 - "Workin' Like a Dog"
 4:02 - "Thin White Line" (McGuire)
 3:50 - "The Girl Don't Know"
 3:33 - "The Real World"
 3:23 - "Don't Like Being Told What to Do"
 3:33 - "Boy with a Beat"
 3:46 - "The Best Way (to Hold a Man)"
 4:12 - "$100,000.00"
 3:24 - "Ain't Gonna Swallow My Pride"
 4:20 - "The Last of the Gypsies"

Band members

 Vocals - Ra McGuire
 Guitar - Brian Smith
 Drums - Mike Schmidt
 Bass - Larry Church
 Keyboards - Blaine Smith

Singles

 "Boy With A Beat" / "$100,000.00"
 "The Best Way (To Hold A Man)"
 "Thin White Line"

References

Trooper (band) albums
1989 albums